The 1970 Yukon general election was held on 8 September 1970 to elect the seven members of the 22nd Yukon Territorial Council. The council was non-partisan and had merely an advisory role to the federally appointed Commissioner. There were twenty-one candidates, and 5,152 out of a potential 7,700 electors voted, a turnout of 66.9%.

The members elected to the council were Hilda Watson, Ken McKinnon, Norman Chamberlist, Don Taylor, Clive Tanner, Mike Stutter and Ronald Rivett. Watson and Chamberlist were the two members appointed to the council's new executive committee.

Election results

References

Elections in Yukon
1970 elections in Canada
1970 in Yukon
September 1970 events in Canada